Whitecrow Glacier is in Glacier National Park, U.S. state of Montana. Between 1966 and 2005, Whitecrow Glacier lost over 47 percent of its surface area.

References

See also
 List of glaciers in the United States
 Glaciers in Glacier National Park (U.S.)

Glaciers of Glacier County, Montana
Glaciers of Glacier National Park (U.S.)
Glaciers of Montana